The 1919 International cricket season was from April 1919 to August 1919. The season consists with English domestic season and Australian Imperial Forces tour in England.

References

1919 in cricket